In mathematics, the Jacobson–Morozov theorem is the assertion that nilpotent elements in a semi-simple Lie algebra can be extended to sl2-triples. The theorem is named after , .

Statement

The statement of Jacobson–Morozov relies on the following preliminary notions: an sl2-triple in a semi-simple Lie algebra  (throughout in this article, over a field of characteristic zero) is a homomorphism of Lie algebras . Equivalently, it is a triple  of elements in  satisfying the relations 

An element  is called nilpotent, if the endomorphism  (known as the adjoint representation) is a nilpotent endomorphism. It is an elementary fact that for any sl2-triple , e must be nilpotent. The Jacobson–Morozov theorem states that, conversely, any nilpotent non-zero element  can be extended to an sl2-triple.

The theorem can also be stated for linear algebraic groups (again over a field k of characteristic zero): any morphism (of algebraic groups) from the additive group  to a reductive group H factors through the embedding 

Furthermore, any two such factorizations

are conjugate by a k-point of H.

Generalization

References

		

Lie algebras
Algebraic groups